Gunsmoke is a 1953 American Western film directed by Nathan Juran and starring Audie Murphy, Susan Cabot, and Paul Kelly. The film has no connection to the contemporary radio and later TV series of the same name. The film was based on the 1951 novel Roughshod by Norman A. Fox.

Plot
Murphy stars as Reb Kittridge, a wandering hired gun who is hired to get the deeds of the last remaining ranch not owned by local boss Matt Telford. That last ranch is owned by Dan Saxon.  Though Reb has not yet accepted the job he is ambushed by Saxon's ramrod, ranch foreman Curly Mather, who kills his horse.  Once in town, he is challenged to a gun fight by Saxon, but shoots Saxon in his gun hand instead of with a killing shot.

Saxon, a former wild outlaw who has settled down, senses Reb has good in him and when he hears Reb's goal in life is to own his own ranch he loses the deed of the ranch to Reb in a card draw.  It is obvious he does this on purpose since he earlier won a similar contest by outdrawing his opponent's king.

Reb takes over the ranch and moving its cattle herd to a railhead for sale to the workers.  Telford hires Reb's fellow gunslinger and sometime friend, Johnny Lake to stop the herd and Reb.  Reb has also fallen in love with Rita, the rancher's daughter, who currently is in love with Mather.

Cast
 Audie Murphy as Reb Kittridge
 Susan Cabot as Rita Saxon
 Paul Kelly as Dan Saxon
 Charles Drake as Johnny Lake
 Mary Castle as Cora Dufrayne
 Jack Kelly as Curly Mather
 Jesse White as Professor
 Donald Randolph as Matt Telford
 William Reynolds as Brazos
 Chubby Johnson as Doc Farrell

Production
The movie started filming in June 1952 under the title of Roughshod. It was the first of three Westerns Murphy made with Nathan Juran over two years. Filming took place in Big Bear Lake, California.

References

External links
 
 
 
 
 

1953 films
1953 Western (genre) films
Audie Murphy
Films directed by Nathan Juran
American Western (genre) films
Films based on American novels
Films based on Western (genre) novels
Films set in ghost towns
Films shot in Big Bear Lake, California
Universal Pictures films
1950s English-language films
1950s American films